Ash Howarth, better known by his stage name Edwin van Cleef, is a nu-disco/electronic musician from Leeds, England.

Career
In 2009 Edwin released his first EP entitled "Overtaken" on his own label, Space Disco. It included remixes from FM Attack, Neo Tokyo and Mille.

In 2011 Edwin released his cover of Phoenix – Lisztomania featuring Kids at Midnight singer Jane Elizabeth Hanley. Lisztomania received widespread coverage from multiple Music Blogs around the world as well as appearing on Ministry of Sound's Uncovered Volume 3 in Australia and Off The Rocker's Sofa Disco compilation released on Avex in Japan.

Around the same time, Edwin's second EP entitled "Never Be Alone at Night" was released on the label Schmooze, including the songs "Never Be alone at Night feat. Gemini Club", "Triton" and "I Feel You". The title track also appeared on the Fierce Disco V Compilation.

Edwin van Cleef has been playlisted by major DJs such as Laidback Luke, The Aston Shuffle, and Matt Darey and has also had songs playlisted by DJs on radio stations such as BBC Radio 1 in the UK and Triple J in Australia.

As well as his own material, Edwin has officially remixed artists such as Chilly Gonzales, Nelly Furtado, Shinichi Osawa and The Knocks. Unofficial remixes include the likes of John Legend, Phoenix and Metronomy.

Discography

Singles and EPs
"Overtaken" (2009)
"Never Be Alone at Night" (2011)
"Falling/Nala" (2011)
"All I Think About Is You" (2012)
"Two As One" (2013)

Remixes
 Freshlovers – Beverley Hills Chase (2009)
 Vicknoise – Get Away (2010)
 Jolly – Da Bump (2010)
 Funkstar Deluxe – Do You Feel (2010)
 Housse de Racket – Champions (2010)
 The Futureheads – Heartbeat Song (2011)
 Chilly Gonzales – You Can Dance (2011)
 Shinichi Osawa feat. Tommie Sunshine – Love Will Guide You (2011)
 Nelly Furtado – The Night Is Young (2011)
 The Penelopes – Sally in the Galaxy (2012)
 John Legend – Rolling in the Deep (2012)
 Mighty Mouse – Between The Pavement and the Stars (2012)
 Allan Guevara – You Know (2012)
 Cosmo Black – Blind (2012)
 The Knocks – The Feeling (2013)
 Phoenix – Trying To Be Cool (2013)
 Metronomy – I'm Aquarius (2013)

Covers
 Phoenix – Lisztomania (2011)

References

External links
 Official website

Year of birth missing (living people)
Living people
British electronic musicians
Nu-disco musicians
Remixers